Maybes is the debut EP by UK electronic duo Mount Kimbie, released in January 2009 through Hotflush Recordings as 12" vinyl and digital download. It received praise from critics.

Reception

Maybes was met with enthusiastic response. Resident Advisor wrote that "there's plenty of space for flights of imaginative fancy here," and reasoned "that the duo have managed something this accomplished for their debut indicates the probable arrival of a major talent." XLR8R described the work as "deceptively complex, with a sense of floating formlessness akin to the gentler side of '90s-era British IDM". Pitchfork Media wrote that the EP "should be of interest to listeners who find dubstep's pervasive moodiness to be a turn-off" and stated that, along with the group's subsequent Sketch on Glass EP, it contained "character, humor, light chaos, nice sound design, and real melodic imperative".

Track listing
All tracks written by Dominic Maker, Kai Campos.

Personnel
Dominic Maker – songwriter, producer
Kai Campos – songwriter, producer
Aaron Zimmermann – artwork and design
Gordon Curtis – artwork and design
Sam John – mastering

References

2009 debut EPs
Mount Kimbie albums